Sir Richard Lee, 2nd Baronet (ca. 1600April 1660) was an English politician who sat in the House of Commons  from 1640 to 1642. He supported the Royalist side in the English Civil War.

Early life 
Lee was the son of Sir Humphrey Lee, 1st Baronet of Langley and Acton Burnell, Shropshire, and his wife Margaret Corbett, daughter of Richard Corbett of Stoke, justice of the King's Bench.

Career 
In November 1640, Lee was elected Member of Parliament for Shropshire in the Long Parliament. He was disabled from sitting in parliament on 6 September 1642 for executing a Commission of Array after it was declared illegal. He suffered for his support of the King and had to compound for his estate for £3719.

Personal life 
Lee married Elizabeth Allen, daughter of Sir Edward Allen, alderman of London. They had two daughters Rachael who married Ralph Cleaton and Mary who married Sir Edward Smythe, 1st Baronet.

References

1600s births
1660 deaths
Baronets in the Baronetage of England
Lee,Richard